Lucknow - Agra Fort Intercity Express is an Intercity Express train of the Indian Railways connecting Agra Fort and Lucknow Junction in Uttar Pradesh. It is currently being operated with 12179/12180 train numbers on a daily basis.

Service

The 12179/Lucknow Jn. - Agra Fort. Intercity Express has an average speed of 55 km/hr and covers 326 km in 6 hrs. 12180/Agra Fort. - Lucknow Jn. Intercity Express has an average speed of 55 km/hr and covers 331 km in 5 hrs 55 mins.

Route and halts 

 
 
 
 
 
 
 
 
 
 Shikohabad Junction

Coach composite

The train consists of 13 coaches :

 2 AC III Chair Car 
 9 Second Class sitting
 4 General
 2 Second-class Luggage/parcel van

Traction

Both trains are hauled by a Ghaziabad Loco Shed  based WAP-7 or WAP-4 electric locomotive.

See also 

 Gatimaan Express
 Agra Cantt New Delhi Intercity Express
 Gomti Express

External links 

 12179/Lucknow Jn. - Agra Cantt. InterCity SF Express
 12180/Agra Cantt. - Lucknow Jn. InterCity SF Express

References 

Passenger trains originating from Lucknow
Trains from Agra
Intercity Express (Indian Railways) trains